The Lin–Tsien equation (named after C. C. Lin and H. S. Tsien) is an integrable partial differential equation

 

Integrability of this equation follows from its being, modulo an appropriate linear change of dependent and independent variables, a potential form of the dispersionless KP equation. Namely, if  satisfies the Lin–Tsien equation, then  satisfies, modulo the said change of variables, the dispersionless KP equation. The Lin-Tsien equation admits a (3+1)-dimensional integrable generalization, see.

References 

 D. Zwillinger. Handbook of Differential Equations, 3rd ed. Boston, MA: Academic Press, p. 138, 1997.
 
 

Partial differential equations